Virginiamycin S1 is a macrolide antibiotic in the group of antibiotics known as streptogramin B.

References

Macrolide antibiotics